Striscia la notizia is an Italian satirical television program on the Mediaset-controlled Canale 5. Launched in 1988, it is meant to be a parody of the daily news, which airs right before the program, but Striscia also satirizes government corruption and exposes scams with the help of local reporters who are also comedians. The program is created by Antonio Ricci and is hosted by two major comedians.

The name of the show literally translates in English as "The News Slither".

Gabibbo
Gabibbo, an Italian cultural icon, is the red mascot of the TV show, with a strong Genoa accent. Always loud, braggart but pungent in his naive but straightforward ways, it is one of the reporters of the program and it also sings and dances the theme song at the end of every episode. The character appears also in another TV show called Paperissima.

Veline
The term velina is a figurative term in Italian journalism which refers to government-issued propagated news. It is a parody of the news industry during the Fascist era under Benito Mussolini, where the government controlled and heavily censored all news reports and papers.

Within Striscia, the veline are two young women (one blonde, the other brunette) who perform short dances called stacchetti, always finishing up on the news anchors' desk. Originally, they also came on stage to hand the "news anchors" their news.

Since 2012, the term velina became an entry in Italian dictionaries.

List of veline
Source:

Golden Tapir

The Tapiro d'Oro (Golden Tapir), a small golden statue, is a special prize usually delivered to big celebrities or politicians who have been humiliated or defeated. Although many personalities take it in front of the cameras in the hope of getting attention for themselves, others run away and Valerio Staffelli, a special correspondent for the show, has to run after them until they finally take it. Some even react aggressively. In 2003, Rai Uno Director Fabrizio Del Noce, cornered by Staffelli, banged his microphone on the reporter's face, breaking Staffelli's nose.

Subtitles

Each edition of Striscia la notizia uses a different subtitle.

Ratings since 2001

Awards 
Striscia la notizia is one of the most awarded Italian TV shows ever. 

 1990 – Premio Regia Televisiva
 1990 – Telegatto 
 1991 – Telegatto 
 1995 – Telegatto 
 1995 – Premio Regia Televisiva
 1996 – Premio Regia Televisiva
 1997 – Telegatto 
 1997 – Premio Regia Televisiva 
 1998 – Telegatto 
 1998 – Premio Regia Televisiva
 1999 – Telegatto 
 1999 – Premio Regia Televisiva
 2000 – Telegatto 
 2000 – Telegatto 
 2000 – Premio Regia Televisiva
 2001 – Telegatto 
 2001 – Telegatto 
 2001 – Premio Regia Televisiva
 2002 – Telegatto
 2002 – Premio Regia Televisiva
 2003 – Telegatto 
 2003 – Premio Regia Televisiva
 2004 – Premio Regia Televisiva
 2005 – Premio Regia Televisiva
 2006 – Telegatto 
 2006 – Premio Regia Televisiva 
 2007 – Telegatto 
 2007 – Premio Regia Televisiva
 2007 – Premio Regia Televisiva
 2008 – Telegatto
 2008 – Telegatto Special Anniversary
 2008 – Premio Regia Televisiva
 2008 – Premio Regia Televisiva 
 2008 – Leggio d'oro
 2009 – Premio Regia Televisiva
 2010 – Premio Regia Televisiva
 2011 – Premio Regia Televisiva
 2011 – Guinness World Records Longest-running satirical news TV programme
 2012 – Premio Regia Televisiva
 2012 – VideoFestival Città di Imperia 
 2012 – Celebrity Games (Winner)
 2013 – Premio Regia Televisiva
 2014 – Premio Regia Televisiva 
 2015 – Premio Regia Televisiva
 2016 – Premio Regia Televisiva
 2017 – Telegatto Special edition for Striscia la notizia 30th season

International editions

Cronica Cârcotașilor (Romania)
Fiks Fare (Albania)
Kiks Kosova (Kosovo)
Gospodari Na Efira (Bulgaria)

References

External links 
 

Italian comedy television series
1988 Italian television series debuts
1980s Italian television series
1990s Italian television series
2000s Italian television series
2010s Italian television series
Italia 1 original programming